Justien Odeurs (born 30 May 1997) is a Belgian footballer who plays for RSC Anderlecht and the Belgium national team.

She played for Belgium at UEFA Women's Euro 2017.

References

External links
 

1997 births
Living people
Belgian women's footballers
Belgium women's international footballers
Expatriate women's footballers in Germany
Women's association football goalkeepers
FF USV Jena players
RSC Anderlecht (women) players
Super League Vrouwenvoetbal players
Belgian expatriate sportspeople in Germany
People from Sint-Truiden
Footballers from Limburg (Belgium)
UEFA Women's Euro 2017 players
21st-century Belgian women